= Seshulatha Kosuru =

Indian musical artist

Dr. Seshulatha Kosuru
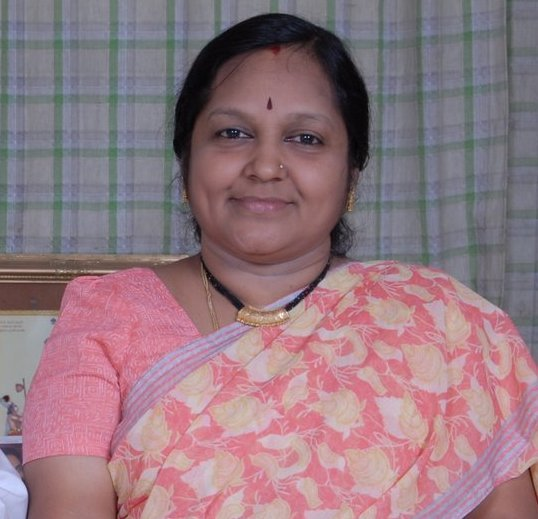
- Dr. Seshulatha Kosuru

Background information
- Origin: India
- Genres: Carnatic music, Indian classical music
- Occupation: Vocalist

Dr. Seshulatha Kosuru is a leading Carnatic musician and teacher from Andhra Pradesh. She has performed widely in India and abroad and has received numerous awards and titles from many leading organizations. She has tuned and released many carnatic & devotional albums and has also set to tune many dance ballets.

== Background ==
She holds a Ph.D. in music from Potti Sriramulu Telugu University, Hyderabad, for her thesis The Rare Janya Ragas having Single Composition of Musical Trinity with Special Reference to Tyagaraja.

She holds an MA in music from Padmavathi Mahila University, Tirupathi, an MA in Telugu literature from Osmania University and BA in music from Andhra University.

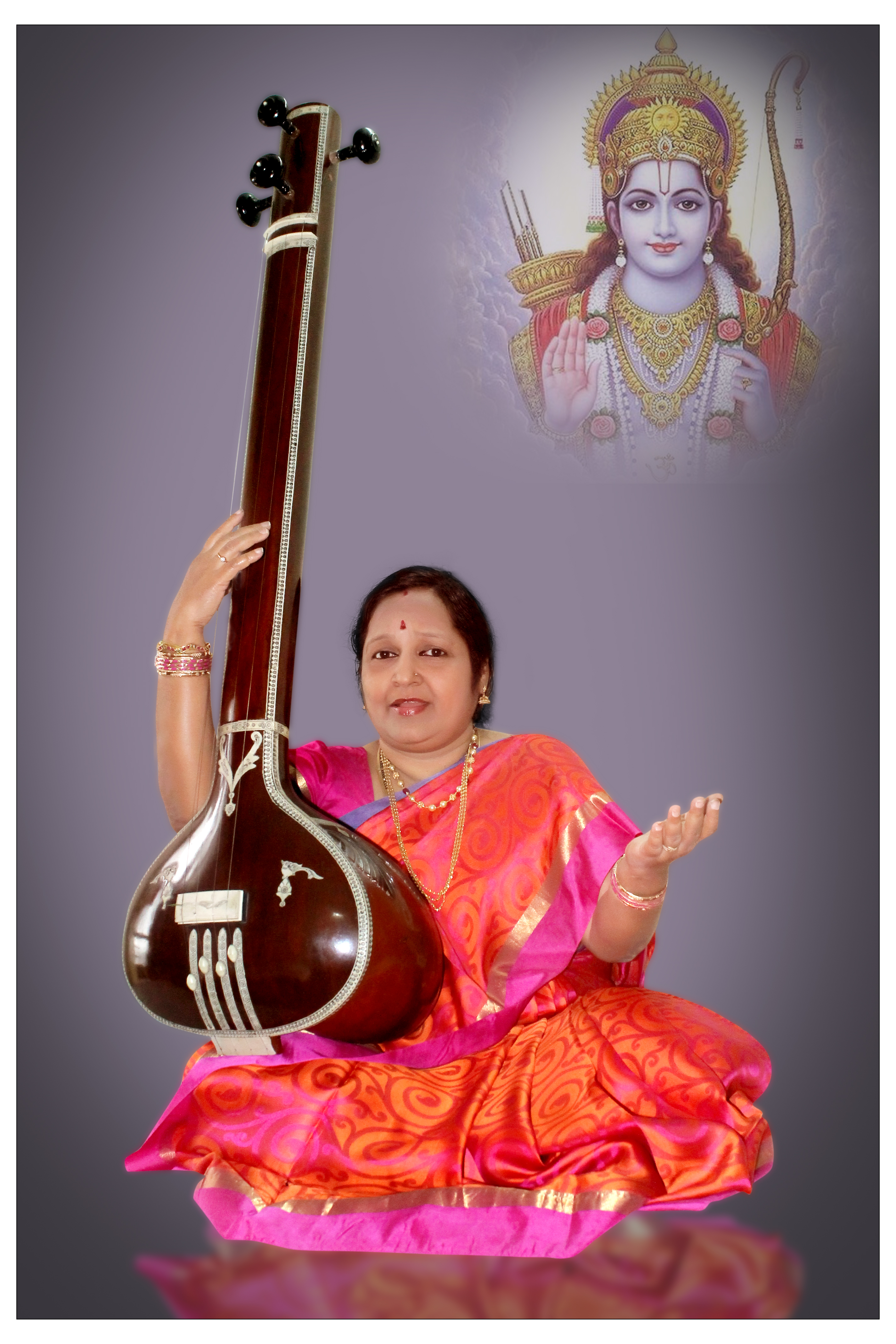

She had her initial training under her mother and Sri Chodavarapu Subba Rao, Sri Desapathi Raju, Sri Sistu Prabhakara Krishna Murthy Sastry and received further training at Kalapeetham, Tirupati during 1980-81 under the guidance of Sri Balantrapu Rajanikantha Rao, Sri A. Narayana Iyer, Sri K.R.Ganapathi and V.L.Janaki Ram. She received advanced training from Late Sri Voleti Venkateswarulu during 1981–88 with scholarship from Sangeet Academy of Andhra Pradesh Govt, and also received advanced training from Sangita Kalanidhi Sri Nedunuri Krishnamurthy.

== Professional experience ==
- Seshulatha Kosuru has been giving numerous performances both in India and abroad
- She is a member of faculty, Department of Music, Telugu University since 1989
- She is a graded AIR, Hyderabad artist in both classical and light music styles
- She has given performances in classical & devotional music on AIR, Doordhrshan & other television channels
- Judge on several music shows on television & other music associations
- She has set music to a number of lyrics and compositions and also several dance ballets (Sarwam sayi mayam, sambhavaami yuge yuge, Goda devi etc.,) & musical operas.
- Conducts various lecture demonstrations, private classes at home and also online
- She is currently a teacher and Academy Registrar at SIFAS (Singapore Indian Fine Arts Society).

== Awards ==
- Dwaram Venkataswami Naidu and Smt. Ivaturi Bala Swaraswati Devi Memorial Cash prizes for standing first in BA Music in 1984
- Recipient of ‘Outstanding Young Talented Person Award’ at the District and State level from Jaycees Club in 1987
- Recipient of Smt. Rukmini Jagannathan Puraskar for standing First in Sangeet Alankar from Akhil Bharateeya Gandharve Vidyalaya Mandal Maharashtra, 1998
